Anystipalpus is a genus of mites in the family Ascidae.

Species
 Anystipalpus percicola Berlese, 1911

References

Ascidae